Idioteuthis latipinna is a species of whip-lash squid. It is the type species of the genus Idioteuthis. Richard E. Young and Michael Vecchione consider I. latipinna to be a junior synonym of I. cordiformis and the World Register of Marine Species states that it is a taxon inquirendum.

References
Sasaki, M. 1916. Notes on Oegopsid Cephalopods Found in Japan. Annotationes Zoologicae Japonenses 9(2): 89-120.
Sasaki, M. 1929. A Monograph of the Dibranchiate Cephalopods of the Japanese and Adjacent Waters. Journal of the College of Agriculture, Hokkaido Imperial University, 20(supplement). 357 pp.

External links

Tree of Life web project: Idioteuthis latipinna

Whip-lash squid
Molluscs described in 1916